Rajarathinam Stadium is a stadium located on Marshalls Road in Egmore, Chennai, Tamil Nadu, India, and is owned by the state police department. The stadium had chiefly been used as a parade ground for police personnel.

Pre-renovation
The stadium, which had been used primarily as a police parade ground, is currently under renovation. It also serves as a venue for morning walk for the locals. Before renovation, it was also used for the passing out parade for senior police officers, especially directors-general of police (DGPs) and also as a venue for the sports meets and annual day celebrations of the city schools.

Renovation
The re-construction of the stadium began in 2009 with a fund allocation of  31.655 million for building the barracks and a training centre. The construction was handed over to the Tamil Nadu Police Housing Corporation (TNPHC) Limited. New facilities include a 400-metre-long track with nine lanes; an FRP-sheet-covered gallery that included offices, library, classrooms and dormitories for men and women; a VIP area with a longue, an air-conditioned viewing gallery, and rooms for commentators; four blocks of common toilets; and two blocks of attached toilets. Two types of galleries have been built—a main gallery with a plinth area of 12,000 sq ft and two additional galleries spread over 4,521 sq ft each.

References

External links

Sports venues in Chennai
Buildings and structures in Chennai
Year of establishment missing